is a Japanese manga series written and illustrated by Shiro Moriya. It was serialized on the Shōnen Jump+ app and website from September 2018 to June 2021. As of September 2021, three volumes have been released.

Publication
The series is written and illustrated by Shiro Moriya. It started serialization on the Shōnen Jump+ manga app and website in September 2018. In March 2019, the series entered hiatus due to Moriya's health. It returned from hiatus on April 12, 2021. In May 2021, it was announced the series was entering its climax. The series published its final chapter on June 14, 2021. As of September 2021, the chapters have been collected into three tankōbon volumes.

In January 2019, Manga Plus launched its service, with the series being one of the titles available on the service in English at launch.

In September 2022, Seven Seas Entertainment announced their licensing of the series. The first volume will be released in May 2023.

Volume list

Reception
Jacob Parker-Dalton from Otaquest praised the series, calling it "brimming with cinematic beauty" and comparing it to Judge Dredd and The Promised Neverland.

References

External links
 Soloist in a Cage at Shōnen Jump+ 

2018 webcomic debuts
Action anime and manga
Dystopian anime and manga
Japanese webcomics
Mystery anime and manga
Prisons in anime and manga
Seven Seas Entertainment titles
Shōnen manga
Shueisha manga
Thriller anime and manga
Webcomics in print